Saad Bin Tefla AlAjmi (also known as Saad Bin Tiflah or Saad Al Ajmi) is a Kuwaiti businessman and politician. He has been Kuwait's Minister of Information and Culture.

Political career 
He has headed the Kuwait Information Center in London and worked as an interpreter and advisor in the Kuwaiti parliament. In 1999, he was appointed Minister of Information and Culture.

Professional career 
He is a lecturer at Kuwait University and a journalist. 

He was director of the Kuwaiti Media Center in London and is currently a contributor to the London-based Arabic newspaper Asharq al-Awasat as well as other Gulf publications.

References

Kuwaiti politicians
Kuwaiti businesspeople
Living people
20th-century Kuwaiti businesspeople
Year of birth missing (living people)